Park Chan-young (born 26 January 1983) is a South Korean handball player. At the 2012 Summer Olympics he competed with the South Korea men's national handball team in the men's tournament. His wife Lee Min-hee is also a handball player.

References

Living people
1983 births
Handball players at the 2012 Summer Olympics
Olympic handball players of South Korea
South Korean male handball players
Asian Games medalists in handball
Handball players at the 2006 Asian Games
Handball players at the 2010 Asian Games
Asian Games gold medalists for South Korea
Medalists at the 2010 Asian Games
21st-century South Korean people